The Liga Nacional de Handebol 2017 (2017 National Handball League) was the 21st season of the top tier Brazilian handball national competitions for clubs, it is organized by the Brazilian Handball Confederation. For the 7th time EC Pinheiros was crowned champion winning in a two extra time final against Handebol Taubaté.

Teams qualified for the second stage
South Southeast Conference
 Handebol Taubaté
 EC Pinheiros
 Handebol São Caetano
 Handebol Londrina
Northeastern Conference
 Clube Portugues
Northern Conference
 Carajás Handebol
Central west Conference
 Mega Alpha Handebol
 Handebol Rio Verde

Second stage

Group A

Group B

Final Four

Final

References

External links
Tournament page on CBHb official web site

Bra